Peter Ward (born 27 July 1955) is an English retired footballer, whose most successful times were with Brighton & Hove Albion, mostly as a forward. He now lives in the United States.

Early life
Ward was born at St. Michael's Hospital in Lichfield, Staffordshire. He was the first child born to his parents, Colin and Mavis Ward, who met as members of the Derby Serenaders marching band. The band remained a major part of Ward's family life, with Colin encouraging Ward to take up playing the drums as well. Along with music, he was attracted to football from an early age; his father would later state that he "kicked a ball around as soon as he could walk."

Club career

Early career and Brighton
Ward was an apprentice engine fitter at the Rolls-Royce plant in Derby. While there he played for non-league side Burton Albion making 50 appearances and scoring 21 goals. He was transferred to Brighton & Hove Albion F.C. in 1975 for a fee of £4000 (almost $5,500). The move also saw Burton manager Ken Gutteridge move to the Albion as Assistant Manager. Initially, Ward played in the Brighton Reserves. His first game with the first team came on 27 March 1976 against Hereford United. He scored in the first minute in a game that ended 1–1.

During the 1976–77 season, he scored 36 goals, beating the club record and winning him the golden boot. He is still revered by Brighton fans who sing a song dreaming of a team in which every player is Peter Ward: 'We all live in a Wardy Wonderland.'  After finishing second in Division Two in 1978–79, Brighton were promoted to the old Football League First Division. Ward put in a transfer request; however, differences were resolved and he still wore the Brighton shirt for the first game in the top flight which saw Brighton lose 4–0 to Arsenal. In November of that year Brighton accepted a £400,000 offer from Nottingham Forest, but Forest manager Brian Clough changed his mind and withdrew it.

Nottingham Forest
Ward finally did move to Nottingham Forest in October 1980 in a three-way deal which saw Gary Birtles leave Forest for Manchester United and Andy Ritchie move south from United to Brighton. He made 28 league appearances for Nottingham Forest and scored seven goals, but things did not work out. Ward was sent on loan to American side Seattle Sounders where he scored 18 goals in the 1981–82 season putting him third in the list of top NASL goalscorers that season.

Back at Brighton
Ward returned to Brighton on loan in October 1982. The loan lasted four months, during which time he scored three goals, including the only goal in a 1–0 victory over Manchester United. Nottingham Forest refused to extend the loan deal further.

North America
In September 1983, Ward signed with the Vancouver Whitecaps of the North American Soccer League. He played the 1983–1984 NASL indoor and 1984 outdoor season in Vancouver. On 17 October 1984, the Whitecaps sold Ward's contract to the Cleveland Force of the Major Indoor Soccer League. He spent three seasons with the Force. On 26 June 1987, the Force sent Ward to the Tacoma Stars in exchange for Glen Lurie and the Stars' 1988 and 1989 first-round and 1990 third-round draft picks.

Ward became a free agent at the end of the 1988–1989 season and the Stars did not offer him a contract. He used the summer outdoor season to play for the Tampa Bay Rowdies of the American Soccer League. On 6 September 1989, he signed with the Wichita Wings of the MISL. On 22 January 1990, the Wings sent Ward and Mike Stankovic to the Baltimore Blast for David Byrne and Keder. In 1991, he again played for the Tampa Bay Rowdies, now playing in the American Professional Soccer League.

International career
In 1977, Ward had been selected for an England under-21 game against Norway. He scored a hat trick in a 6–0 win for England. He was selected for the full England squad against Luxembourg a month later but did not make it onto the pitch. His only full cap came on 31 May 1980, in a 2–1 win over Australia. Ward came on in the 85th minute, making his international career the shortest ever for an England player. His record of 6 minutes has since been surpassed by Martin Kelly.

Personal life
In 2002, Ward married his second wife, Jacqueline. He has three daughters from his first marriage. From 2002–2005, Ward coached soccer at Tampa Catholic High School located in Tampa, Florida. In 2011, he began coaching for Celtic FC Florida in Largo, Florida.  Ward scored both goals for the Yellow Team en route to a 2–0 win during FC Tampa Bay's 2011 Celebrity Halftime Game.

References

External links
 NASL/MISL stats

1955 births
Living people
English footballers
England international footballers
England B international footballers
England under-21 international footballers
American Professional Soccer League players
American Soccer League (1988–89) players
Baltimore Blast (1980–1992) players
Brighton & Hove Albion F.C. players
Burton Albion F.C. players
Cleveland Force (original MISL) players
Major Indoor Soccer League (1978–1992) players
Nottingham Forest F.C. players
North American Soccer League (1968–1984) players
North American Soccer League (1968–1984) indoor players
Footballers from Derby
Seattle Sounders (1974–1983) players
Tampa Bay Rowdies (1975–1993) players
Tacoma Stars players
Vancouver Whitecaps (1974–1984) players
Wichita Wings (MISL) players
Association football forwards
English expatriate sportspeople in the United States
Expatriate soccer players in the United States
English expatriate footballers
English expatriate sportspeople in Canada
Expatriate soccer players in Canada